Patrick Cusack Roney or Rooney (bapt. 2 April 1781 – 26 August 1849) was an Irish physician who was president of the Royal College of Surgeons in Ireland (RCSI) in 1814 and 1828.

He was indentured to his surgeon father, Cusick Roney, on the in 1795, and studied professionally in the Royal College of Surgeons in Ireland, where he obtained his Licentiate and subsequently elected a Member of RCSI in 1803. In 1802 Roney succeeded George O'Brien as Surgeon to the Meath Hospital, and retained that position until his death. He was also Surgeon to Kilmainham Prison. At first he resided in Dominickstreet, and about 1824 changed his residence to York-street.

He speculated largely in stocks, and lost heavily. This misfortune obliged him to leave Dublin, and he resided with one of his sons in London for several years. He returned to Dublin, and died of Asiatic cholera on 26 August 1849, at Mountpleasant-square, and was buried in St. Catherine's Churchyard, James's-street. Roney had married Charlotte Mulley in 1804. Their son was the railway executive Sir Cusack Patrick Roney (1809–1868).

Arms

See also
 List of presidents of the Royal College of Surgeons in Ireland

References 

Presidents of the Royal College of Surgeons in Ireland
1849 deaths
1781 births
Medical doctors from Dublin (city)